USS LSM(R)-501 was the lead ship of the LSM(R)-501-class landing ship medium built in 1945 for service in World War II. She was later converted into a test range support ship and renamed USS Elk River (IX-501). Her namesake was a Minnesota town named Elk River.

Construction and career 
LSM(R)-501 was laid down on 24 March 1945 at Houston, Texas, by the Brown Shipbuilding Company. She was launched on 21 April 1945 and commissioned on 27 May 1945.

LSM(R)-501 served in the Pacific before and after the Japanese Surrender in September 1945. This vessel was designed to carry both shorter range guns and rocket launchers to deliver large volumes of fire in short periods. Decommissioned on 1 August 1946 at Astoria, the vessel was laid up in the reserve fleet Columbia River Group.

Renamed and redesignated USS Elk River (IX-501) on 1 October 1955, she was converted into a test range support ship at Avondale Shipyards and at San Francisco Bay Naval Shipyard.

In November 1967, she was underway off Long Beach, California in support of the SEALAB III Project.

In early 1982, Elk River began her installation of the Mk.14 CCSDS until the summer of that year. The ship later served as a barracks craft in October 1986.

Struck from the Naval Register in August 1999, Elk River was sunk as a target in February 2001.

A model of USS Elk River (LSM(R)-501, later IX-501) is on display in the Cold War Gallery, Building 70.

Awards 

 Navy Meritorious Unit Commendation
 American Campaign Medal 
 World War II Victory Medal 
 National Defense Service Medal

References

Naval History and Heritage Command: USS Elk River (LSMR-501, later IX-501)
NavSource Online: Elk River (IX-501)
Naval Vessel Register: ELK RIVER (IX 501) 

LSM(R)-501-class medium landing ships
Ships built in Houston
1945 ships
World War II amphibious warfare vessels of the United States
Cold War auxiliary ships of the United States
Maritime incidents in 2001
Ships sunk as targets